Pipi A was a High Priest of Ptah during the 21st Dynasty.

Pipi is known from a genealogy known as Berlin 23673, where he is said to be a contemporary of Pharaoh Psusennes I. He is also mentioned in a genealogy from the Louvre. Pipi A was the father of the High Priest of Ptah Harsiese.

Publications regarding Berlin 23673 and Louvre 96 

 L Borchardt, Die Mittel zur Zeitlichen Festlegung von Punkten de Aegyptischen Geschichte und ihre Anwendung, 1935, pg 96-112
 E Chassinat, Recueil de travaux relatifs à la philologie et à l'archéologie égyptiennes et assyriennes, 22 (1900) 16–17, No 54
 Malinine, Posener, Vercoutter, Catalogue des steles de Sérapéum de Memphis, I, 1968, No. 52, pp. 48–49
 Kees, Zeitschrift fur Agyptischer Sprache, 87 (1962), 146-9

References

Memphis High Priests of Ptah
People of the Twenty-first Dynasty of Egypt
Year of death unknown
Year of birth unknown